Social Science Research is a quarterly peer-reviewed academic journal covering the field of sociology. It was established in 1972 by Academic Press and is currently published by Elsevier, which acquired Academic Press in 2000. The editor-in-chief is Stephanie Moller (University of North Carolina at Charlotte).

Abstracting and indexing
The journal is abstracted and indexed in:

According to the Journal Citation Reports, the journal has a 2021 impact factor of 2.617.

References

External links 
 

Sociology journals
Elsevier academic journals
Publications established in 1972
Quarterly journals
English-language journals